Matías Horacio Milozzi (born October 20, 1978 in Quilmes, Buenos Aires, Argentina) is an Argentine footballer currently playing for Aquanera of the Seri in Italy, Independiente Chivilcoy 2012/2015

 MATIAS HORACIO MILOZZI | Delantero de nacionalidad Argentino nacido en Quilmes (BUE). Jugó 132 partidos y convirtió 22 goles en 5 categorías de Argentina (Primera División, Segunda División, Tercera División, Federal A, Federal B). Jugó 152 partidos y convirtió 64 goles en el extranjero. Para los registros historicos de BDFA jugó 320 partidos y convirtió 86 goles.

Teams
  Quilmes 1999-2001
  Arsenal de Sarandí 2001
  Quilmes 2002
  Trujillanos 2002
  Unión Atlético Maracaibo 2003
  Rangers 2004
  Deportivo Italchacao 2005
  Melgar 2005
  Once Municipal 2006
  Comarca Nijar 2006-2007
  Brindisi 2007-2008
  Fasano 2008-2009
  Fondi 2009
  Formia 2010
  Olympia Agnonese 2010-2011
  Aquanera 2011–2013
  Club Atlético Independiente de Chivilcoy 2013-2017
  Club Colon DE Chivilcoy  2017
  Club Atlético Gimnasia de Chivilcoy 2017-2019

References
 

1978 births
Living people
Argentine footballers
Argentine expatriate footballers
Arsenal de Sarandí footballers
Quilmes Atlético Club footballers
FBC Melgar footballers
UA Maracaibo players
Trujillanos FC players
Once Municipal footballers
Rangers de Talca footballers
Chilean Primera División players
Argentine Primera División players
Expatriate footballers in Chile
Expatriate footballers in Peru
Expatriate footballers in Spain
Expatriate footballers in Italy
Expatriate footballers in Venezuela
Expatriate footballers in El Salvador
Association football forwards
People from Quilmes
Sportspeople from Buenos Aires Province